Kladanija  is a village in Croatia. It is connected by the D200 highway.

Populated places in Istria County